The 2013 French motorcycle Grand Prix was the fourth round of the 2013 Grand Prix motorcycle racing season. It took place on the weekend of 17–19 May 2013 at the Bugatti Circuit in Le Mans, France.

Classification

MotoGP

Moto2
The race was red-flagged on lap 24 of 26 due to rain; the final results were taken from the end of lap 22.

Moto3

Championship standings after the race (MotoGP)
Below are the standings for the top five riders and constructors after round four has concluded.

Riders' Championship standings

Constructors' Championship standings

 Note: Only the top five positions are included for both sets of standings.

References

French motorcycle Grand Prix
French
Motorcycle Grand Prix
French motorcycle Grand Prix